Settle is the debut studio album by English electronic music duo Disclosure, released on 31 May 2013 by PMR Records and Island Records. Accompanied by the success of its lead single, "Latch", featuring Sam Smith, the album features collaborations with AlunaGeorge, Ed Macfarlane of Friendly Fires, Sasha Keable, Eliza Doolittle, Jamie Woon, Jessie Ware, and London Grammar. A deluxe edition of the album contains four bonus tracks, including Disclosure's remix of Ware's song "Running".

Settle received widespread critical praise, and was nominated for the 2013 Mercury Prize. The album debuted at number one on the UK Albums Chart, selling 44,633 copies in its first week. It was certified platinum by the British Phonographic Industry (BPI) on 4 April 2014, denoting shipments in excess of 300,000 copies. In the United States, the album reached number one on the Billboard Dance/Electronic Albums chart with 10,000 units sold after a promotional discount on Google Play Music. It had sold 165,000 copies in the United States by September 2015. A companion remix album, titled Settle: The Remixes, was released in December 2013.

Singles
"Latch" was released as the lead single from the album on 8 October 2012. The song peaked at number 11 on the UK Singles Chart. It also charted in Australia, Belgium, Denmark, Ireland, France, the Netherlands, and the United States.

"White Noise" was released as the second single from the album on 1 February 2013. The song reached number two on the UK Singles Chart, becoming Disclosure's highest-peaking single to date. It also charted in Belgium and Ireland.

"You & Me" was released as the third single from the album on 28 April 2013. The song peaked at number 10 on the UK Singles Chart.

"When a Fire Starts to Burn" was released as the fourth single from the album on 24 May 2013.

"F for You" was released as the fifth single on 2 August 2013. The song charted at number 20 in the UK. The single was re-released on 5 February 2014 with Mary J. Blige providing guest vocals.

"Help Me Lose My Mind" was released as the album's sixth single on 25 October 2013. The song reached number 56 on the UK Singles Chart.

"Voices" was released as the album's seventh and final single on 13 December 2013.

Critical reception

Settle received widespread acclaim from music critics. At Metacritic, which assigns a normalised rating out of 100 to reviews from mainstream publications, the album received an average score of 81, based on 31 reviews. Robert Copsey of Digital Spy gave the album a positive review stating: "Despite the list of vocalists reading like a who's who on the Hype Machine chart, Guy and Howard's presence is felt strongly throughout, although the featureless tracks 'Second Chance' and 'Grab Her' are the weaker on the collection. Regardless, much like Daft Punk's latest effort, Settle is an album that brings some sorely needed intelligence back to joyous dance-pop."

Eve Barlow of NME gave the album a positive review stating: "Throughout, Settle will blind you with so much sheen you'll want to tile your bathroom in it. Sadly, the London Grammar-featuring 'Help Me Lose My Mind' is a bit of an unnecessary cool-down. Not to worry, Disclosuremania is clearly about to sweep the nation."

In July 2022, Rolling Stone ranked Settle as the 93rd best debut album of all time.

Track listing
All songs produced by Disclosure.

Notes
 Settle: The Remixes was released in the United States in place of the special edition.

Sample credits
 "Intro" and "When a Fire Starts to Burn" contain samples of "Rope-a-Dope" by motivational speaker Eric Thomas.
 "Stimulation" contains vocal samples by Lianne La Havas.
 "Second Chance" contains a sample of "Get Along with You" by Kelis.
 "Grab Her!" contains a sample of "Look of Love" by Slum Village.

Personnel
Credits adapted from the liner notes of Settle.

 Disclosure – production, mixing
 Sam Smith – vocals 
 Howard Lawrence – vocals 
 Aluna Francis – vocals 
 Ed Macfarlane – vocals 
 Sasha Keable – vocals 
 Eliza Doolittle – vocals 
 Jamie Woon – vocals 
 Jessie Ware – vocals 
 Hannah Reid – vocals 
 Stuart Hawkes – mastering at Metropolis Studios (London)

Charts

Weekly charts

Year-end charts

Certifications

Release history

References

2013 debut albums
Cherrytree Records albums
Disclosure (band) albums
European Border Breakers Award-winning albums
Interscope Geffen A&M Records albums
Interscope Records albums
Island Records albums